Sinan Pasha Mosque may refer to:

 Sinan Pasha Mosque (Damascus) in Damascus, Syria
 Sinan Pasha Mosque (Istanbul) in Istanbul, Turkey
 Sinan Pasha Mosque (Prizren) in Prizren, Kosovo
 Sinan Pasha Mosque (Kaçanik) in Kaçanik, Kosovo
 Sinan Pasha Mosque (Bulaq) in Bulaq, Cairo, Egypt